Margaret Harkett ( at Tyburn), was an English woman executed for witchcraft.

She was a sixty year old widow from Stanmore at the time she was arrested. She was accused of having bewitched two of her neighbors to death. She was given a death sentenced. 

She was executed by hanging at Tyburn. She was the first person executed for Witchcraft in the city of London after the introduction of the Witchcraft Act of 1563

Her case was publicized in the pamphlet The Several Facts of Witchcraft approved and laid to the charge of Margaret Harkett (1585).

See also
 Anne Kerke

References

 
 Matthew Dyson, David Ibbetson, London: The Executioner's City

1585 deaths
Witch trials in England
16th-century English women
16th-century English people
Executed English women
People executed for witchcraft
16th-century executions by England
People executed by England by hanging
People executed at Tyburn